Ronald Walsh or Bunna Walsh (born 1933) is an Australian former politician.

Ronald Walsh or Ron Walsh may also refer to:

 Ron Walsh (born 1932), Australian rules footballer who played with North Melbourne
 Ron Walsh (One Life to Live), fictional character on the ABC soap opera One Life to Live